Stephen Whitfield may refer to:
Stephen J. Whitfield, American historian
Stephen Whitfield Swindal, American businessman
Stephen Whitfield "Steve" Dils or Steve Dils(born 1955) is an American retired football quarterback
Steve Whitfield, Australian cricketer